Kyzyl-Kyshtak is a village in Osh Region of Kyrgyzstan. It is part of the Kara-Suu District. Its population was 11,971 in 2021. It is around 5 km north of the centre of the city of Osh, and just a few km from the Uzbek border.

Population

Literature
  
  
  
 
  УДК 351/354. ББК 66,3(2Ки).

See also
 Urinboy Rahmonberdievich Rakhmonov

References

External links
 Добрые дела депутата
 Кызыл-Кыштак
 Увековечена память выдающегося деятеля культуры Кыргызстана Уринбоя Рахмонова

Populated places in Osh Region